Eirini Georgatou (born 1 February 1990) is a Greek former tennis player.

On 16 May 2011, she reached her career-high singles ranking of 176. Her highest doubles ranking of 171 she achieved on 31 January 2011. Most of her success came in tournaments in Greece, Israel, Turkey, and Uzbekistan.

In September 2010, she qualified for her first WTA Tour event, in Tashkent, Uzbekistan. She won three qualifying matches in straight sets, and then lost to second-seeded and hometown favorite Akgul Amanmuradova in the first round of the main draw. She played doubles with Russian partner Elena Bovina, and they reached the quarterfinals before falling 9–11 in the third set super tiebreaker to fourth-seeded Maria Kondratieva of Russia and Sophie Lefèvre of France.

Fed Cup
In February 2011, she represented Greece in Group One Euro/African Zone of the fed cup which took place in Eilat, Israel. In the round-robin stage on 2 February 2011, she won over Jelena Pandžić from Croatia (2–6, 6–1, 6–4), and with the Greek Eleni Daniilidou, she beat Ani Mijacika and Silvia Njiric in the doubles, 6–3, 2–6, 6–2, and completed 3–0 win of Greece over Croatia. On 3 February 2011 she lost to Patricia Mayr-Achleitner (6–4, 3–6, 3–6), and lost with Despina Papamichail to Melanie Klaffner and Sandra Klemenschits whom represented Austria. On 4 February 2011, she lost to Olga Govortsova 2–6, 3–6. In the relegation round against Denmark, on 5 February 2011, she defeated Karen Barbat 6–1, 7–6(2) in singles, and in the doubles with Eleni Daniilidou, she defeated Danish double Mai Grage and Caroline Wozniacki, 6–2, 7–5. This win made sure Greece will stay in Group 1 of the Fed cup.

ITF Circuit finals

Singles: 8 (5 titles, 3 runner-ups)

Doubles: 5 (2 titles, 3 runner-ups)

References

External links
 
 
 
 

Living people
Greek female tennis players
1990 births
Sportspeople from Athens